Onnelliset leikit is a 1964 Finnish comedy film directed by Aito Mäkinen and Esko Elstelä. It was entered into the 4th Moscow International Film Festival.

Cast
 Pirkko Peltonen (segment "Juulia")
 Raimo Nenonen (segment "Juulia")
 Riitta Elstelä as Mother (segment "Tikku")
 Lasse Liemola as Father (segment "Tikku")
 Eeva Elstelä as Daughter (segment "Tikku")
 Saara Elstelä as Daughter (segment "Tikku")
 Joel Elstelä as Son (segment "Tikku")
 Tuija Hulkko
 Etta-Liisa Kunnas
 Ritva Vepsä

References

External links
 

1964 films
1964 comedy films
1960s Finnish-language films
Finnish black-and-white films
Finnish comedy films